DASH (short for Density And Scale Height) were a pair of 2.5 meter balloon satellites launched in 1963. They were designed to measure air density at very high altitude, but their orbit was significantly affected by solar radiation pressure.

References 

Satellites of the United States
1963 in spaceflight